Pennsylvania Route 173 (PA 173) is 45.7-mile-long (73.5 km) state highway located in western Pennsylvania, running from PA Route 8 south of Slippery Rock in Butler County, to PA Route 27 north of Cochranton in Crawford County.

Route description

PA 173 is designated as part of Washington’s Trail between its southern terminus at PA Route 8 and Slippery Rock.

Near the north end of town, the route intersects with PA 108 at the southern terminus of PA Route 258. About  later, the route crosses the county line.

After entering Mercer County, PA 173 continues northerly almost  to the borough of Grove City, the site of Wendall August Forge and Grove City College. The route intersects with PA Route 58, and the two overlap northeastward . About  later, the concurrency ends, PA 173 continues north, and leaves the borough. The route interchanges with I-80 about  later, and then intersects with PA Route 965 about  after that at the village of Perrine’s Corners.  

PA 173 enters the borough of Sandy Lake  later, where it forms a brief concurrency with US 62; the concurrency ends at the eastern terminus of PA Route 358. PA 173 leaves the borough, and just over  later, intersects with Georgetown Rd., which is the former alignment of PA Route 285 in the borough of New Lebanon.

A little more than  after entering Crawford County, PA 173 turns northeasterly as it intersects with the eastern terminus of PA Route 285, and then enters the borough of Cochranton shortly thereafter.  In Cochranton, the route intersects with the former alignment of US 322, and then  later, after leaving the borough, it intersects with the current alignment of US 322.  Not quite  later, the route passes through the village of Kasters Corners, and then runs another  before its northern terminus at PA Route 27.

History
In 1926, the segment from Stone House to Slippery Rock was designated as PA 8. In 1941, the entire alignment was designated as PA 78 before receiving the current number in 1961.

Major intersections

See also

References

External links

Pennsylvania Highways: PA 173

173
Transportation in Butler County, Pennsylvania
Transportation in Mercer County, Pennsylvania
Transportation in Crawford County, Pennsylvania